Ibrahima Konaté (born 25 May 1999) is a French professional footballer who plays as a centre-back for Premier League club Liverpool and the France national team.

Starting off with Sochaux, Konaté moved to RB Leipzig in 2017. After four years with the club, Liverpool signed him in 2021 for a fee of £36 million. He won the EFL Cup and FA Cup in his first season.

Early and personal life
Ibrahima Konaté was born on 25 May 1999 in Paris.  He grew up on a council estate in the 11th arrondissement of Paris and is the second youngest of eight children born to parents from Mali.
He is a Muslim. Outside of football, Konaté is a fan of Attack on Titan as his favourite series.

Club career

Early career
Konaté grew up in the 11th arrondissement of Paris and played as a teen for Paris FC youth teams. When he was 14, he left for Sochaux and joined their boarding academy at the age of 15. He started his career as a striker before moving to the defence.

Sochaux
Konaté made his professional debut for Sochaux in a 1–0 Ligue 2 loss to Auxerre on 7 February 2017, at the age of 16.

RB Leipzig 
After a successful debut season, with 12 games and 1 goal in half a season, Konaté joined RB Leipzig in the Bundesliga on 12 June 2017 on a five-year contract by free transfer. Konaté scored his first Leipzig goal in a 4–0 win against Fortuna Düsseldorf.

Liverpool
On 28 May 2021, Liverpool announced that they had reached an agreement with RB Leipzig to acquire Konaté on 1 July, pending international clearance and a work permit being granted. The club had already agreed personal terms with the player in April, and triggered his release clause of approximately £36 million in May 2021. On 18 September, Konaté made his Premier League debut, starting alongside Virgil van Dijk, and kept a clean sheet in a 3–0 victory against Crystal Palace. He made his second start of the season partnering Virgil van Dijk in the first North-West Derby of the season, in which Liverpool beat Manchester United 5–0. It was the heaviest defeat inflicted on United by Liverpool since 1895 and the heaviest defeat United had suffered without scoring in since 1955. Konaté won plaudits from fans for how he handled star players like Cristiano Ronaldo and Bruno Fernandes and also featured in Garth Crooks' team of the week, with Crooks saying, "No frills or skills but he does use his power and strength to maximum effect. This was shown in match against Manchester United, Mason Greenwood, Cristiano Ronaldo and Marcus Rashford hardly had a kick."

On 5 April 2022, Konaté scored his first goal for Liverpool, a header in a 3–1 away win against Benfica in the UEFA Champions League quarter-final first leg.

Konaté missed the beginning of the 2022–23 season through injury.

International career
Konaté received his first call-up to the senior France national team on 4 June 2022 for the UEFA Nations League, replacing Raphaël Varane due to injury. He made his full international debut on 10 June in a 1–1 draw against Austria. On 9 November, Konaté was included in Didier Deschamps's squad for the 2022 FIFA World Cup, where he helped France reach the final.

Style of play

Konaté has been compared to Virgil van Dijk due to his positional play, tackling, pace and strength. Guido Schafer said that: "he is tall, fast, good technique and he is a little bit of Virgil van Dijk. He has very high-class potential. He is a great athlete, he has good speed and there are no silly tackles - he is an intelligent player." Konaté is also well known for his passing and strength in the air.

Career statistics

Club

International

Honours
RB Leipzig
DFB-Pokal runner-up: 2018–19, 2020–21

Liverpool
FA Cup: 2021–22
EFL Cup: 2021–22
FA Community Shield: 2022
UEFA Champions League runner-up: 2021–22

France
FIFA World Cup runner-up: 2022

References

External links

Profile at the Liverpool F.C. website

1999 births
Living people
Footballers from Paris
French footballers
Association football defenders
Paris FC players
FC Sochaux-Montbéliard players
RB Leipzig players
Liverpool F.C. players
Championnat National 3 players
Ligue 2 players
Bundesliga players
Premier League players
FA Cup Final players
France youth international footballers
France under-21 international footballers
France international footballers
2022 FIFA World Cup players
French expatriate footballers
Expatriate footballers in England
Expatriate footballers in Germany
French expatriate sportspeople in England
French expatriate sportspeople in Germany
French Muslims
Black French sportspeople
French people of Malian descent